The Montreal Canadiens are a professional ice hockey team based in Montreal. They are members of the Atlantic Division in the Eastern Conference of the National Hockey League (NHL) and are one of the Original Six teams of the league. Founded in 1909, they have played a total of 113 seasons, eight with the National Hockey Association (NHA) and 105 with the NHA's successor, the NHL. They are the only club to have played every season for both leagues and the only active NHL team to pre-date the founding of that league. They have won the Stanley Cup 24 times, once under the NHA and 23 times since the founding of the NHL, and have also won 11 O'Brien Cup titles, 24 division championships, and eight conference championships. Overall they have the most games played, most wins, most ties, most points, most years in the playoffs, most division championships, and most Stanley Cup championships of any team in the NHL.

Table key

NHA (1910–1917)
From 1909–10 until 1916–17 the Canadiens played 8 seasons in the National Hockey Association (NHA). They qualified for the postseason three times and won two NHA championships as well as their first Stanley Cup title.

Notes (1910–1917)
The Canadiens finished the 1913–14 season tied with the Toronto Blueshirts. The Blueshirts won the playoff and so the Canadiens finished in second place.
From the 1910 season to the 1916–17 season, the O'Brien Cup was awarded to the champion of the NHA. 
The 1916–17 NHA season was played in two half seasons. Montreal qualified for the two-game total-goal playoff by winning the first half of the schedule.

NHL

Notes
From the 1917–18 season to the 1920–21 season, the NHL played a split season schedule. The winners of both halves faced each other in a two-game, total-goals series for the NHL championship.
From the 1917–18 season to the 1925–26 season, the NHL had no divisions.
From the 1917–18 season to the 1926–27 season, the O'Brien Cup was awarded to the champion of the NHL.
The 1919 Stanley Cup Finals were suspended due to the 1918 flu pandemic.
The NHL declared the Canadiens to be league champions in 1925 when the Hamilton Tigers refused to play in the NHL Finals due to a dispute over player salaries.
From the 1926–27 season to the 1937–38 season, the Canadiens played in the Canadian Division.
From the 1927–28 season to the 1937–38 season, the O'Brien Cup was awarded to the champion of the Canadian Division.
From the 1938–39 season to the 1966–67 season, the NHL had no divisions.
From the 1938–39 season to the 1949–50 season, the O'Brien Cup was awarded to the NHL playoff runner-up, and was retired after the 1949–50 season.
Before the 1967–68 season, the NHL split into East and West Divisions because of the addition of six expansion teams.
The NHL realigned before the 1974–75 season. The Canadiens were placed in the Prince of Wales Conference's Norris Division.
Between 1974–75 and 1980–81, Conference championships were awarded to the team that finished first overall in their respective conference in the regular season.
Before the 1981–82 season, the NHL moved the Canadiens to the Adams Division.
Since 1981–82, Conference championships are awarded to the team that wins the Conference Finals in their respective conference in the postseason.
The NHL realigned into Eastern and Western conferences prior to the 1993–94 season. Montreal was placed in the Northeast Division of the Eastern Conference.
The season was shortened to 48 games because of the 1994–95 NHL lockout.
Beginning with the 1999–2000 season, teams received one point for losing a regular-season game in overtime.
The season was cancelled because of the 2004–05 NHL lockout.
Before the 2005–06 season, the NHL instituted a penalty shootout for regular-season games that remained tied after a five-minute overtime period, which prevented ties.
The season was shortened to 48 games because of the 2012–13 NHL lockout.
The NHL realigned prior to the 2013–14 season. The Canadiens were placed in the Atlantic Division of the Eastern Conference.
The season was suspended on March 12, 2020 because of the COVID-19 pandemic. The top 24 teams in the league qualified for the playoffs.
Due to the COVID-19 pandemic, the 2020–21 NHL season was shortened to 56 games.

Totals from all seasons

References

External links 
 Montreal Canadiens official website

 
Montreal Canadiens
seasons